Sudarshan Gupta (born 21 July 1960) is an Indian politician and member of the Bharatiya Janata Party, currently serving as the Madhya Pradesh Vice President to the party. Gupta is a former member of the Madhya Pradesh Legislative Assembly from Indore-1 constituency in Indore. Gupta lost the 2018 Madhya Pradesh Assembly election against Sanjay Shukla of Congress candidate and later congratulated him at his residence.

References

External links
 
 
 

Living people
Bharatiya Janata Party politicians from Madhya Pradesh
Politicians from Indore
1960 births
Madhya Pradesh MLAs 2008–2013
Madhya Pradesh MLAs 2013–2018